The Parent's Assistant is the first collection of children's stories by Maria Edgeworth, published by Joseph Johnson in 1796.

Contents

The first edition (Part I) had five stories: Lazy Lawrence, Tarlton, The Little Dog Trusty, The Orange Man and The False Key. Barring Out was included in the second edition of Part I published the same year.  In later editions more material was added, most notably, "The Purple Jar", and a play for children, Old Poz.  The 1865 American edition contained the following stories: "Lazy Lawrence", "Tarlton", "The False Key", "The Birthday Present", "Simple Susan", "The Bracelets", "The Little Merchants", "Old Poz", "The Mimic", "Mademoiselle Panache", "The Basket Woman", "The White Pigeon", "The Orphans", "Waste Not, Want Not", "Forgive and Forget", "The Barring Out, or Party Spirit", and "Eton Montem".

Influence
Queen Victoria was reading The Parent's Assistant in 1837, just three months before her coronation. She recalls reading "The Birthday Present" in "Miss Edgeworth's inimitable and delightful Parent's Assistant" while doing her hair. The collection is also mentioned in William Thackeray's novel Vanity Fair and is mentioned in Eight Cousins also.

Notes

References
 Carpenter, Humphrey and Mari Prichard. Oxford Companion to Children's Literature. Oxford University Press, 1997. 
 Zipes, Jack (ed) et al. The Norton Anthology of Children's Literature: The Traditions in English.  W. W. Norton, 2005. 
 Zipes, Jack (ed.). The Oxford Encyclopedia of Children's Literature. Volumes 1-4. Oxford University Press, 2006. 
 Watson, Victor, The Cambridge Guide to Children's Books in English. Cambridge University Press, 2001. 
 Demmers, Patricia (ed). From Instruction to Delight: An Anthology of Children's Literature to 1850, Oxford University Press, 2003.  Table of Contents. 384 pages. . 
 St. John, Judith. The Osborne Collection of Early Children's Books, 1566-1910, A Catalogue, Toronto Public Library.

External links
 British Library: Children's Literature
 Search publishing histories: Copac: Academic & National Library Catalogue at the University of Manchester.
 Another website: British Library: Integrated Catalogue.
 Search: Library of Congress Online Catalog
 Search: National Union Catalog of Manuscript Collections
 Course syllabus: Studies in Eighteenth century literature: Books for Children, at the University of Toronto.

1796 short story collections
1790s children's books
Children's short story collections
Irish short story collections
18th-century British children's literature